Hoga Mogadishu is a Somali football club based in Mogadishu, Somalia which currently plays in Somali Second Division the second division of Somali Football.

In 1968 the team has won the Somalia League.

Stadium
Currently the team plays at the 15000 capacity Banadir Stadium.

Honours
Somalia League: 1968

Performance in CAF competitions
 African Cup of Champions Clubs: 1 appearance
1969 African Cup of Champions Clubs: First Round

References

External links
 

Football clubs in Somalia